Kraslice is a town in Sokolov District in the Karlovy Vary Region of the Czech Republic. It has about 6,500 inhabitants. It was a large and important town until the World War II. It is known for manufacture of musical instruments.

Administrative parts

Town parts and villages of Černá, Čirá, Hraničná, Kámen, Kostelní, Krásná, Liboc, Mlýnská, Počátky, Sklená, Sněžná, Tisová, Valtéřov and Zelená Hora are administrative parts of Kraslice.

Etymology
The roots of the name derive from the medieval German Graz, meaning "trimmed conifer twigs". The name Graslitz was then a diminutive of the word Graz. The Czech name Kraslice is a transliteration of the German name and also literally means "blown easter egg".

Geography
It lies on the border with Germany, adjacent to the German town of Klingenthal. It is situated in the western part of the Ore Mountains. The built-up area is situated in the valley of the Svatava River and its tributary, the Stříbrný Stream.

Kraslice lies in an area known for swarm type seismic activity. The last strong earthquake swarm was in 1986.

History

The area was settled by German monks from Waldsassen Abbey in the 12th and 13th centuries. In the mid-13th century, a guard castle was built here and settlements were established around it. The first written mention of Kraslice is from 1272, when King Ottokar II of Bohemia donated it to Jindřich the Elder of Plavno. During the rule of the lords of Plavno in the 14th century, tin, lead and silver mining has developed in the area, and Kraslice became a prosperous settlement. In 1370, it was promoted by Charles IV to a royal town.

At the beginning of the 15th century, Kraslice became the seat of the robber knights, and in 1412 the town was looted by the army, which aimed to rid the region of robbers. The town did not recover until 1527, when it was acquired by Jeroným Schlick and made it a free mining town. Ore mining in the vicinity of Kraslice has been declining since the 17th century. From 1666 to 1848, the town was owned by the Nostic family. Mining was replaced by folk crafts, the textile industry, and the manufacture of musical instruments and toys. In 1886, the railway was built.

From 1938 to 1945 it was annexed by Nazi Germany and administered as part of Reichsgau Sudetenland. In 1944 a women's subcamp of Flossenbürg concentration camp was established here. The German-speaking population was expelled in 1945 and the town was resettled with Czechs.

Demographics

Economy
Kraslice is known for the Amati Kraslice company, a manufacturer of musical instruments. The tradition of this manufacture dates back to 1631.

Transport
The town lies on railway line from Sokolov to Klingenthal. Passenger services are provided by the railway company of GW Train Regio.

Sights

The landmark of the town centre is the Church of the Corpus Cristi. It was built in the neo-Romanesque style in 1893–1896 and replaced a dilapidated church from 1619. It is a three-aisled basilica with a prominent tower. 

Municipal slaughterhouse is a unique complex of Art Nouveau buildings, created in 1904. It is protected as a technical and cultural monument. Today it is privately owned and gradually reconstructed.

Notable people
Julius Meinl I (1824–1914), Austrian businessman, founder of Julius Meinl AG
Rudolf Dellinger (1857–1910), German Bohemian composer
Roland Bauer (1928–2017), German politician
Petr Drozda (born 1952), wrestler and stuntman
Eliška Staňková (born 1984), discus thrower
Kateřina Zohnová (born 1984), basketball player
Michael Krmenčík (born 1993), footballer

Twin towns – sister cities

Kraslice is twinned with:
 Klingenthal, Germany

References

External links

Cities and towns in the Czech Republic
Populated places in Sokolov District